Lê Sỹ Minh (born 23 March 1993) is a Vietnamese footballer who plays as a midfielder for V.League 1 club Hải Phòng.

References 

1993 births
Living people
Vietnamese footballers
Association football midfielders
V.League 1 players
Nam Định F.C. players
People from Thái Bình province